Blue Mountain Railroad may refer to:
Blue Mountain Railroad (Pacific Northwest), 1992–1999, now part of Palouse River and Coulee City Railroad
Blue Mountain Railroad (Pennsylvania), never built